Alexandrovsky Sad:

 Alexander Garden
 Aleksandrovsky Sad (Moscow Metro)
 Alexander Garden (St. Petersburg)
 Alexander Garden (Nizhny Novgorod)
 Alexander Garden (Kirov)
 Alexandrovsky Sad (TV series, 2005)
 Alexandrovsky Sad (TV series, 2007)
 Alexandrovsky Sad (TV series, 2008)

ru:Александровский сад